Hans Hermann von Katte (28 February 1704 – 6 November 1730) was a Lieutenant of the Prussian Army, and a friend, tutor and possible lover of the future King Frederick II of Prussia, who was at the time the Crown Prince. Katte was executed by Frederick's father, the Prussian King Frederick William I, when Frederick plotted to escape from Prussia to Britain. Most modern historians believe that Frederick intended to defect to the service of the British King George II (his maternal uncle) and possibly return to Prussia to depose his father.

Life 
Born in the Prussian capital of Berlin, Katte was a nobleman by birth, coming from a long line of aristocratic military men. His ancestors were squires of Wust in the Altmark. His father, Hans Heinrich Graf von Katte, was one of Frederick William I's most regarded cuirassiers. Katte's mother, Dorothee Sophia von Wartensleben, was the daughter of a seasoned and revered field marshal, Graf Leopold Alexander von Wartensleben. Hans Hermann studied in Königsberg and Utrecht, focusing on French and law. After completing his studies he joined the Prussian Army.

It is not known when Frederick II and Katte met for the first time. However, when they both attended private mathematics and mechanics lessons in 1729, they became acquainted rapidly. Frederick, eight years younger than Katte, admired Katte for his cosmopolitan attitude. Both were interested in poetry and playing the flute. The pair had an intimate relationship, and due to the long-standing perception (even during his own lifetime) of Frederick as homosexual, has led some historians to speculate that their relationship may have been romantic and/or sexual.

One day in June 1730, the King came home earlier than expected. For one hour Von Katte and Quantz hid in a small room behind the fireplace. His father discovered his secret collection of books and clothes, which he threw in the fire. His books had to be sold or auctioned. Not long after, Frederick revealed to Katte that he had a plan to flee to Great Britain as a way to leave his harsh and despotic father. At first Katte tried to hold Frederick back, but at the end supported Frederick's plan to escape. On 5 August 1730, while the royal retinue was near Mannheim in the Electorate of the Palatinate, Frederick tried to escape from his quarters. At that point Katte stayed in Potsdam. A compromising letter unmasked Katte as an accomplice; Frederick and Katte were subsequently arrested and imprisoned in Küstrin. Because they were army officers who had tried to flee Prussia for England, Frederick William I leveled an accusation of treason against the pair.

A court martial found Katte guilty of desertion and sentenced him to life imprisonment, which would last until the King himself died, but Frederick Wilhelm ordered the sentence changed to beheading, declaring that "it would be better that Katte came to death than the justice out of the world." As Katte was an officer of the King's Guard, Frederick William argued that if Katte were let off lightly, the King's Guard could never be trusted again. All petitions of mercy for Katte, including one from Frederick, were ignored.
 
Katte was beheaded at the fortress of Küstrin, where the king forced Frederick to watch the execution. However, when he was brought up to be executed, Frederick shouted in French to Katte, "Veuillez pardonner mon cher Katte, au nom de Dieu, pardonne-moi!" ("Please forgive me dear Katte, in God's name, forgive me.") Katte called back in the same language, "There is nothing to forgive, I die for you with joy in my heart!" Frederick then fell to the floor in a dead faint. These were Katte's last words, yet not his last farewell. Soon it was discovered that Katte had written a farewell letter to his father before his execution which stated:

Upon witnessing his death, Frederick was plunged into deep despair for three days. After that, he never spoke of Katte again nor ever visited his grave. Katte's remains rest in the crypt of the church in Wust.

References

Further reading 

 Hergemöller, Bernd-Ulrich(1998) "Katte, Hans Hermann von". In: Mann für Mann. Biographisches Lexikon zur Geschichte von Freundesliebe und mann-männlicher Sexualität im deutschen Sprachraum, pp. 411/412. Hamburg: MännerschwarmSkript 
 Kloosterhuis, Jürgen (2006) "Katte. Ordre und Kriegsartikel: Aktenanalytische und militärhistorische Aspekte einer „facheusen“ Geschichte". From: Forschungen zur Brandenburgischen und Preußischen Geschichte. N. F., 15., Berlin 
Merten, Detlef Der Katte-Prozeß, Berlin: De Gruyter  (PDF at Juristischen Gesellschaft Berlin)

1704 births
1730 deaths
Executed people from Berlin
People from the Margraviate of Brandenburg
Prussian Army personnel
German untitled nobility
People executed in the Holy Roman Empire by decapitation
People executed by Prussia
18th-century executions in the Holy Roman Empire